The Brand of Satan is a 1917 American silent horror film directed by George Archainbaud and starring Montagu Love, Gerda Holmes and Evelyn Greeley.

Cast
 Montagu Love as Jacques Cordet 
 Gerda Holmes as Christine 
 Evelyn Greeley as Natalia 
 Al Hart as Manuel Le Grange 
 Nat C. Gross as Francois Villier 
 J. Herbert Frank as Jacques Despard 
 Emile La Croix as Pere Sechard 
 Katherine Johnston as Marie

References

Bibliography
 James Robert Parish & Michael R. Pitts. Film directors: a guide to their American films. Scarecrow Press, 1974.

External links
 

1917 films
1917 horror films
1910s English-language films
American silent feature films
American horror films
Films directed by George Archainbaud
American black-and-white films
World Film Company films
Films shot in Fort Lee, New Jersey
Silent horror films
1910s American films